Ian R. Kerr (January 1, 1965 – August 26, 2019) was a Canadian academic who researched emerging law and technology issues. He held a Canada Research Chair in Ethics, Law, and Technology at the University of Ottawa.

Kerr earned awards and citations, including the Bank of Nova Scotia Award of Excellence in Undergraduate Teaching, the University of Western Ontario’s Faculty of Graduate Studies Award of Teaching Excellence, the University of Ottawa’s AEECLSS Teaching Excellence Award, and the University of Ottawa's Excellence in Education Prize. 

Kerr  at the University of Alberta and the University of Western Ontario.

In addition to co-authoring the business law textbook, Managing the Law (co-authored by Mitchell McInnes, Anthony VanDuzer, and Chi Carmody), he published in the areas of ethical and legal aspects of digital copyright, automated electronic commerce, artificial intelligence, cybercrime, nanotechnology, internet regulation, ISP and intermediary liability, online defamation, pre-natal injuries and unwanted pregnancies.

Prior to joining the faculty at the University of Ottawa, he held a joint appointment in the Faculty of Law, the Faculty of Information & Media Studies and the Department of Philosophy at the University of Western Ontario.

He died on August 26, 2019 from cancer.

Books
Managing the Law: Legal Aspects of Doing Business, a law textbook for business students.
 Lessons from the Identity Trail: Anonymity, Privacy and Identity in a Networked Society, edited by Ian Kerr, Carole Lucock, and Valerie Steeves
 Robot Law, edited by Ryan Calo, A. Michael Froomkin, and Ian Kerr

References

External links
Professor Ian Kerr's Website
On The Identity Trail Project Website
Lessons from the Identity Trail Book on Oxford University Press Website

1965 births
2019 deaths
Canadian bloggers
Lawyers in Ontario
Canadian legal scholars
Place of birth missing
Computer law scholars
Copyright scholars
Scholars of privacy law
Canada Research Chairs
Canadian copyright law
Artificial intelligence ethicists
Academic staff of the University of Western Ontario
University of Western Ontario alumni
University of Alberta alumni
Academic staff of the University of Ottawa